A peaceful transition or transfer of power is a concept important to democratic governments in which the leadership of a government peacefully hands over control of government to a newly-elected leadership. This may be after elections or during the transition from a different kind of political regime, such as the postcommunist period after the fall of the Soviet Union.

In scholarship examining democratization and emerging democracies, study of the successful transitions of power is used to understand the transition to constitutional democracy and the relative stability of that government. A 2014 study concluded that 68 countries had never had a peaceful transition of power due to an election since 1788.

Democratization studies

In scholarship examining democratization and emerging democracies, study of the successful transitions of power is used to understand the transition to constitutional democracy and the relative stability of that government (democratic consolidation). 

A 2014 study by Adam Przeworski of 3,000 elections from 1788 to 2008, published in the journal Comparative Political Studies concluded that 68 countries (including Russia and China) had never had a peaceful transition of power between parties following an election, making it a "rare and a recent practice." The same study found that once a country has an initial peaceful transfer of power (an "alternation"), it is very likely to keep doing so, making the peaceful transition of power a habit-forming activity. In a stable institutionalized democracy, a peaceful transition is the expected outcome of an election.

Peaceful transitions require a number of strong democratic institutions and norms to exist, such as the willingness of opposition parties to serve as a loyal opposition. Transitions by election put power holders in vulnerable positions, as not only do they risk potential changes in policy and practice and thus their means of power, but they also risk political retribution or retaliation.

By region
The first peaceful transition of power in a country is often treated as an important stage in a government transition towards democracy such as seen in elections in the Democratic Republic of the Congo. Successful transitions during tense political moments such as the Velvet Revolution in Armenia in 2018 are interpreted as signs of improved governance within the country, an important milestone in democratization and functioning civil society. Alternately, the lack of peaceful transfers of power, such as in elections in Georgia from 1995 to 2008 in which the only transition between presidents was via the 2003 Rose Revolution, may harm the international reputation of the country as a "democracy".

Africa
Since achieving independence from European colonial powers, Africa has had a mixed record in achieving peaceful transitions of power, with variations among nations.  

The first peaceful transition of power between civilians in Nigeria took place in 2007, although the outgoing and incoming presidents were of the same party and the preceding election was characterized by widespread irregularities. In 2018, Liberia had its first electoral transfer of power since 1944. The first peaceful transition of power in the Democratic Republic of the Congo took place in 2019, with outgoing president Joseph Kabila yielding power to opposition leader Felix Tshisekedi. The first transition of power from one democratically elected leader to another in Niger took place in 2021, overcoming the nation's history of four coups d'etat.

Asia

Indonesia
Symbolism

The symbol of peaceful transition of power is when the outgoing president and/or vice president, after their respective successors recite the oath of office, switch chairs, so that the incumbent president is on the furthest left side of the altar at the People's Consultative Assembly main session's room, and the sitting vice president is immediately on the right side of the speaker and deputies speaker's desk. , starting in 1978, the vice presidents always did this symbolic transfer when there was no vacancy in the office except in 2004, when Hamzah Haz did not attend the ceremony, and in 2009, when Jusuf Kalla was already seated on the furthest right side so no switch was needed. For presidents, this symbol of peaceful transition happened only twice, in 1999 during the inauguration of Abdurrahman Wahid, and in 2014 for the first inauguration of Joko Widodo.

Europe

Belarus

During the 2020 Belarusian protests that followed the disputed results of the Belarusian presidential election in August 2020, Belarusians created a Coordination Council and a shadow government, the National Anti-Crisis Management (NAM), aiming for a peaceful transfer of power to a freely and fairly elected president. NAM proposed a "constitutional" option for power transfer, in which the presumed presidential election winner, Sviatlana Tsikhanouskaya, would become Prime Minister and the powers of the de facto president Alexander Lukashenko would be legally transferred to the Prime Minister's position, followed by elections for a new president organised by a newly created electoral commission; and a "legal sovereignty" option, in which Tsikhanouskaya would become President and organise presidential elections within 40–70 days.

Georgia
The transfer of power resulting from the 2012 Georgian parliamentary election was considered an important case of peaceful transfer of power in the post-Soviet political development of Georgia, which, since the Soviet period, had earlier gone through changes such as the Rose Revolution in 2003.

North America

United States
A peaceful transition of power has historically been the norm in United States presidential transitions. The transition from John Adams to Thomas Jefferson in 1801 was considered an important milestone for the United States' fledgling democracy. From then until 2020, the losing party in every presidential election "willingly and peacefully" relinquished power to the opposition. The transition is institutionalized through symbolic acts like the presidential inaugurations. Outgoing U.S. presidents traditionally attend the inaugurations of their successors, a symbol of the peaceful passage of power from one administration to the next.

During the 2020 presidential elections, experts described a risk of democratic backsliding in the U.S., as President Donald Trump publicly refused to commit to a peaceful transfer of power if he lost his election bid. In September 2020, after Trump's statements, the U.S. Senate unanimously passed a resolution committing to a peaceful transition of power and opposing any attempt "by the President or any person in power to overturn the will of the people of the United States"; many senators cited the peaceful transition of power's centrality to U.S. democracy. Business leaders also made statements calling for a peaceful transfer.  

Trump was defeated in the 2020 election by Joe Biden in both the popular vote and the electoral vote, but refused to accept defeat. Trump falsely claimed election fraud, initiated a seven-part plan to overturn the election, and engaged in an aggressive and unprecedented campaign to remain in power.
Trump's fellow Republicans had varied reactions to Trump's false election-fraud claims. Trump stated on 15 October 2020 that he would accept a peaceful transfer (after a long period of ambiguous answers to the question) while still falsely alleging fraud and waging a legal battle to attempt to overturn the election results.  

On January 6, 2021, a pro-Trump mob, inflamed by false claims, attacked the Capitol in Washington, D.C. in a failed attempt to keep Trump in power. The mob disrupted the counting of the electoral votes by a joint session of Congress for several hours. Five people died either shortly before, during, or following the attack. Senate Majority Leader Mitch McConnell noted that "if this election were overturned by mere allegations from the losing side, our democracy would enter a death spiral." On 7 January 2021, Trump condemned the riots and committed to the peaceful transition of power, although since leaving office he has continued to routinely repeat election lies and defend the riots.

South America 
In Venezuela, the Puntofijo Pact allowed a political agreement to respect the election results, allowing for a peaceful transition of power after the ouster of dictator Marcos Pérez Jiménez and during the country's democratic period.

See also 
 Nonviolent revolution
 Peaceful Revolution
 Puntofijo Pact

References 

Democracy
Elections
Articles containing video clips